Aboa Vetus and Ars Nova is a museum in central Turku, Finland. The museum is housed in a building known as the Rettig palace, originally built in 1928. Aboa Vetus displays portions of the city dating back to medieval times, while Ars Nova is a museum of contemporary art.

The museum was first opened in 1995 as two independent museums. Originally, plans were for only Ars Nova, the contemporary art museum, but during its construction a number of structures and artifacts dating back to the Middle Ages were discovered, and the archaeological excavation that was commissioned eventually transformed into Aboa Vetus. The two museums were combined in 2004 and Aboa Vetus & Ars Nova is now among the most popular tourist venues in the entire region of Southwest Finland.

External links
 
 Official site (English version)

Culture in Turku
Museums in Turku
History museums in Finland
Art museums and galleries in Finland